Diving at the 2010 Asian Games was held in Guangzhou, China from November 22 to 26, 2010. Ten competitions were held in both, men and women's. All competition took place at the Aoti Aquatics Centre.

Schedule

Medalists

Men

Women

Medal table

Participating nations
A total of 74 athletes from 14 nations competed in diving at the 2010 Asian Games:

References 

Results

External links
Diving Site of 2010 Asian Games

 
Asia
2010
2010 Asian Games events
2010 Asian Games